Eastern Anatolia Observatory (shortly DAG) is proposed ground-based astronomical observatory of Atatürk University in Erzurum, Turkey.

The project to establish an observatory in Erzurum is conducted by the Astrophysics Research and Application Center of Atatürk University with the scientific and technical coordination of TÜBİTAK National Observatory and financial support of the Ministry of Development, Government of Erzurum Province, 40 universities and seven observatories in the region. It is the country's biggest project for astronomy, astrophysics and space science.

It will host Turkey's first infrared telescope. The contract for the construction of the telescope has been awarded to the Belgian company AMOS in 2014. The request for tender for the design and construction of the rotating hemispherical dome to house the large telescope
was won by the Italian company EIE Group Srl in November 2015. The completion of the observatory is scheduled for end 2019.

References

Astronomical observatories in Turkey
Observatory
Buildings and structures in Erzurum Province
Infrared telescopes
Proposed buildings and structures in Turkey